The 1941 Oglethorpe Stormy Petrels football team represented Oglethorpe University in the sport of American football as a member of the Southern Intercollegiate Athletic Association (SIAA) during the 1941 college football season. The 1941 season was the last season of football at Oglethorpe University. World War II caused the school to end all sports and after the war. A football team has never been restarted. Notable games include the game against Troy State that was decided by a field goal in the final seconds, the only score of the game.

Schedule

References

Oglethorpe
Oglethorpe Stormy Petrels football seasons
Oglethorpe Stormy Petrels football